Charles O'Hara Booth (31 August 1800 – 11 August 1851), was an English-born army officer who served in India, the West Indies and England for a total of 18 years before being posted to Van Diemen's Land, Australia (later to be named  Tasmania). He remained there for a further 18 years, first as commandant of Port Arthur penal settlement and subsequently as the head of an orphan's school. 

In 1815, aged 15, he was sent by his parents to India in the care of an uncle. The following year he joined the 53rd Regiment as an ensign. Three years later he returned to England and applied for a commission in the 21st Fusiliers. From 1820 to 1827 he served in the West Indies before returning to England. With the rank of captain, in 1833 he arrived with his regiment in Van Diemen's Land. He was soon appointed commandant of the principal convict settlement, Port Arthur, and he also controlled all convict stations on the Tasman Peninsula. His position gave him entrée to the upper levels of Van Diemen's Land's small, exclusive society, in which he quickly became well-liked and respected.

In 1840, changes in penal organisation under the probation system confined his jurisdiction to Port Arthur and the adjacent juvenile establishment at Point Puer. Under his command the township of Port Arthur was laid out, small harbours were constructed and swamps reclaimed, a government farm was set up, a convict-powered tramway was constructed, and a semaphore-signal telegraph system was established for faster communications, especially to capture escaped prisoners.

Reputation and achievement
Booth was an impartial and efficient administrator, as prompt to reward as to punish. Lieutenant-Governor George Arthur described him as "kind and humane, active and most determined". He was regarded as severe but just in his treatment of convicts, but he was also accused of being insensitive about individual problems in his zeal to treat all prisoners equally.

In a departure from the focus on severe punishment that characterised penal practices at the time, Booth's initiatives at the juvenile reformatory, Point Puer, separated young prisoners from older, more hardened convicts and gave them special attention and trade training so that the cycle of criminal behaviour could be broken. The reformatory was described as "an oasis in the desert of penal government".

Personal tragedy
In 1838 Booth and a convict assistant, Joseph Turner, became lost in the dense bush of Forestier Peninsula. After they became separated, Turner found a settler who raised the alarm; a large search party was assembled. Booth survived four nights in cold wet autumn weather, suffering exposure, weak with hunger and with only his dogs for company. One of the dogs spotted a searcher and took him to Booth, who was frostbitten and too weak to call out. He never fully recovered from the ordeal.

Later years
In November of the same year, Booth married Elizabeth Charlotte Eagle, the 19-year-old stepdaughter of the regiment's surgeon. His health did not improve and his interest turned to family life; his enthusiasm for the convict settlement declined and he retired from the army in 1839 or 1840. He remained at Port Arthur until, in 1844, he was appointed superintendent of the Queens Orphan School in New Town, a suburb of Hobart. He died suddenly from a heart attack at his home in New Town on 11 August 1851, aged 50. His wife and two daughters returned to England in 1852.

References

Notes

 

1800 births
1851 deaths
English emigrants to colonial Australia
Royal Scots Fusiliers officers
King's Shropshire Light Infantry officers